Stefanie Kouzas (born January 10, 2002) is a soccer player who plays as a midfielder for CS St-Hubert. Born in Canada, she represented the Guyana women's national team.

Early life
Kouzas was born in Montreal, Quebec, to a Greek father and Guyanese mother. She played youth soccer with Lakeshore SC. In 2017, she won the Miss Teenage Québec beauty pagent, qualifying for Miss Teenage Canada.

University career
For university, she attended Champlain College Saint-Lambert, playing for the women's soccer team. She won RSEQ Academic Excellence honours in both 2018 and 2019.

In 2022, she began attending McGill University, where she played for the women's soccer team.

Club career
In 2018, she played in the Première ligue de soccer du Québec with CS Monteuil.

In 2019, she played FC Sélect Rive-Sud in the PLSQ. She scored her first goal on June 8 against CS Fabrose.

International career
In 2020, she trained and was part of the preliminary squad for Guyana U20.

In 2022, she began playing for the Guyana senior team. She made her first start on April 8 against Nicaraugua.

See also
List of Guyana women's international footballers

References

External links

Living people
2002 births
Women's association football midfielders
Citizens of Guyana through descent
Guyanese women's footballers
Champlain College alumni
Soccer players from Montreal
Guyana women's international footballers
Canadian women's soccer players
Canadian sportspeople of Guyanese descent
Première ligue de soccer du Québec players
CS Longueuil players
FC Sélect Rive-Sud players
CS Monteuil players
CS St-Hubert players
Canadian people of Greek descent